Vadim Gusevas (born 16 June 1981) is a Lithuanian cross-country skier. He competed in the men's 15 kilometre classical event at the 2002 Winter Olympics.

References

1981 births
Living people
Lithuanian male cross-country skiers
Olympic cross-country skiers of Lithuania
Cross-country skiers at the 2002 Winter Olympics
People from Visaginas